W-Arly-Pendjari Complex, also known as the "WAP Complex", is a transboundary Natural UNESCO World Heritage Site in Benin, Burkina Faso and Niger covering:
Arli National Park in Burkina Faso
Pendjari National Park in Benin
W National Park, shared by the three countries

Since 2005, the protected area is considered a Lion Conservation Unit and a potential lion stronghold.

See also
Arly-Singou

References

External links
UNESCO World Heritage List: W-Arly-Pendjari Complex
iNaturalist project Biota of the WAP complex

World Heritage Sites in Benin
World Heritage Sites in Burkina Faso
World Heritage Sites in Niger